Northern Military District (Milo N) was a Swedish military district, a command of the Swedish Armed Forces that had operational control over Northern Sweden, for most time of its existence corresponding to the area covered by the counties of Västernorrland, Jämtland, Västerbotten and Norrbotten. The headquarters of Milo N were located in Boden.

History
The Northern Military District (Milo N) was created in 1993 when the number of military districts of Sweden was decreased to three, and as a consequence of that, the Upper Norrland Military District (Milo ÖN) was merged with the Lower Norrland Military District (Milo NN), except Gävleborg County, to create this new military district. In 2000, these last three military districts were disbanded and the command for the whole of Sweden was placed at the Swedish Armed Forces Headquarters, in accordance with the Defence Act of 2000.

Heraldry and traditions

Coat of arms
The coat of arms of the Northern Military District Staff 1994–2000. It was also used by the Northern Military District Staff (MD N) 2000–2005 and the Northern Military Region (MR N) 2018–present. Blazon: "Azure, the provincial badge of Västerbotten, a reindeer courant, armed gules, followed by a mullet, both argent. The shield surmounted an erect sword or."

Medals
In 2000, the Norra militärområdesstabens (MilostabN) minnesmedalj ("Northern Military District Staff (MilostabN) Commemorative Medal") in silver (MiloN SMM) of the 8th size was established. The medal is oval in shape and the medal ribbon is of white moiré with blue edges and a blue stripe on each side.

Commanding officers

Military commanders
1993–1996: Curt Sjöö
1996–1998: Lars G. Persson
1998–2000: Mertil Melin

Chiefs of Staff
1993–1995: Tomas Warming
1995–1996: Folke Rehnström
1996–1996: Lars G. Persson
1996–1998: Kjell Nilsson
1998–2000: Lars Frisk

Names, designations and locations

See also
Military district (Sweden)

Footnotes

References

Notes

Print

Web

Further reading

Military districts of Sweden
Disbanded units and formations of Sweden
Military units and formations established in 1993
Military units and formations disestablished in 2000
1993 establishments in Sweden
2000 disestablishments in Sweden
Boden Garrison